Football in Nauru is played according to three codes: Australian rules football, association football, and rugby union.

Australian rules football in Nauru

Australian rules football is the national sport of Nauru

Association football

Soccer in Nauru is a minor sport.

Rugby union

Rugby union in Nauru is a minor but growing sport.

See also
Culture of Nauru#Sport

Sport in Nauru